"Do the Funky Chicken" is a song written and recorded by American R&B singer and entertainer Rufus Thomas for Stax Records in 1969.   The song was used as the title track of Thomas' 1970 LP, Do The Funky Chicken. 

It became one of his biggest hits, reaching  #5 on the R&B chart in early 1970, #28 on the US pop chart, and #18 in Britain where it was his only chart hit.

Background
The record was one of a series of novelty dance hits for Thomas.   He improvised the song after performing with Willie Mitchell's band at the University of Tennessee, developing it further at a gig in Covington.  Thomas said: I did it in the middle of doing another song... and the words just started to come.  I don't know how, they just came out of the blue.  I just separated it.  'You raise your left arm up, and your right arm too.'  When you're doing the funky chicken you use both arms.  You don't just use one.  It just happened I separated it.  Then I put a little rhythm in between it.  The same pattern that you heard on 'The Dog' is here on 'The Funky Chicken' but it is cut in half.  That's how it came about.

Thomas added a spoken word section that he regularly used as a shtick as a radio DJ: "Oh I feel so unnecessary - this is the kind of stuff that makes you feel like you wanna do something nasty, like waste some chicken gravy on your white shirt right down front." The recording was produced by Al Bell and Tom Nixon, and the instrumental backing was by the Bar-Kays, featuring guitarist Michael Toles.  

Reviewer Stewart Mason described the "Funky Chicken" as "the single goofiest dance craze of the 1970s... While Thomas clearly knows how silly the entire concept is – he starts the record off with his impersonation of a cackling hen – he doesn't let that stop him from getting behind those goofy lyrics and giving them everything he's got...."

Samples
It was sampled by Eazy-E on his 1988 track "Still Talkin'", and by Missy Elliott in 1997 on "Don't Be Commin' (In My Face)".

See also
Chicken (dance)
 "Funky Gibbon"

References

1969 singles
Rufus Thomas songs
Stax Records singles
Songs about dancing
Novelty and fad dances